The De Pere Lock and Dam Historic District is located in De Pere, Wisconsin. It was added to the State Register of Historic Places in 1992 and to the National Register of Historic Places the following year.

References

External links
Historic American Engineering Record (HAER) documentation, filed under De Pere, Brown County, WI:

Historic American Engineering Record in Wisconsin
Historic districts on the National Register of Historic Places in Wisconsin
National Register of Historic Places in Brown County, Wisconsin